WAZX-FM (101.9 MHz) is a commercial FM radio station broadcasting a Regional Mexican radio format.  It is licensed to Cleveland, Georgia.  WAZX-FM is owned by WAZX-FM, Inc.  The studios and offices are on Venture Drive in Duluth, Georgia.  The transmitter is in Clermont, Georgia.

History
In the late 1980s, Terry Barnhardt of Gainesville, Georgia, secured a Federal Communications Commission construction permit to build an FM radio station northwest of Atlanta.  The FCC gave the proposed station the call sign WGGA-FM.

The station first signed on the air in 1989, as WCGX.  In 1991, it was bought by Advantage Media for $1.18 million.  It later had the call letters WCOC.

In 2001, the station's call letters changed again, this time to WAZX-FM.  It was acquired by a firm calling itself WAZX-FM, Inc.  The price of the station had dropped since the previous sale.  The new owners paid $60,000.

References

External links

AZX-FM
AZX-FM
Regional Mexican radio stations in the United States
Radio stations established in 1997